Per Larsen (born 31 May 1962) is a Danish weightlifter. He competed in the men's middle heavyweight event at the 1988 Summer Olympics.

References

1962 births
Living people
Danish male weightlifters
Olympic weightlifters of Denmark
Weightlifters at the 1988 Summer Olympics
Sportspeople from Aalborg